Amchem Products Inc v British Columbia (Workers' Compensation Board), [1993] 1 S.C.R. 897 is a leading decision on forum non conveniens by the Supreme Court of Canada. The Court overturned an anti-suit injunction issued by the British Columbia Supreme Court against the courts in Texas on the basis that the British Columbia (BC) court was not necessarily the better forum for the case.

Background
A number of BC residents began an action against several US manufacturers of asbestos in Texas. The Texas court accepted jurisdiction over the matter and heard the case. The manufacturers applied to the BC Supreme Court to issue an anti-suit injunction, arguing that the proper forum for the plaintiffs would be in BC and not Texas.

The BC Supreme Court issued the injunction. In response, Texas issued an "anti-anti-suit injunction". The BC Supreme Court judgment was upheld on appeal to the BC Court of Appeal.

Ruling of the Court
The Supreme Court of Canada overturned the judgment and found that there was insufficient grounds to deny Texas jurisdiction.

The Court adopts the test for forum non conveniens from Spiliada Maritime Corp. v. Cansulex Ltd., [1987] A.C. 460

See also
 List of Supreme Court of Canada cases
 Morguard Investments Ltd. v. De Savoye, (1990)

References

External links
 

Conflict of laws case law
Supreme Court of Canada cases
1993 in Canadian case law
1993 in the environment
Legal history of Texas
Asbestos disasters
British Columbia law